Louie Adrian Weaver III (born July 13, 1951) is a drummer most famous for being the long-time drummer of Christian rock band Petra. Weaver was dismissed from the band in 2003. He is currently working on several projects. In 2010, Weaver reunited with former members of Petra (Greg X. Volz, Bob Hartman, John Lawry and Mark Kelly) to form Classic Petra.

Starting in 2017, Weaver played in the CPR Band and recorded an album with them.

Biography
Weaver was born in Nashville, Tennessee, where he attended high school at Glencliff High School. He was part of a school jazz band playing at the Nashville Municipal Auditorium. In 1969 he graduated and continued to study in Trevecca Nazarene College. There he obtained a B.A. in percussion.

After graduating he went on to work with several artists. He was a session player for Randy Matthews and Fireworks, also touring with Matthews and Crossfire. He also played with Parable, Good Grief, and Chuck McCleod's Band.

In 1981 he joined Petra becoming a staple of the band with his trademark drumming and style. After 22 years, he was fired in 2003 amidst some controversy. Both Petra and Weaver have since dismissed the incident and little has been discussed of the issue since. He was replaced by Paul Simmons. In 2005 he collaborated with Project Damage Control with John Schlitt on vocals. Weaver performed briefly with a band called Viktor with other well-known veteran musicians.

Weaver played with Classic Petra from 2010 to 2012, which was a re-united version of the band featuring some of the members from the 80's: Bob Hartman, Greg X. Volz, John Lawry and Mark Kelly. This instance of the band recorded Back to the Rock in 2010, which was Weaver's first studio album with the Classic Petra lineup since Beat the System in 1984.

Weaver was voted "Favorite Drummer" by CCM Magazine's readers choice for five years in a row (1989-93.) Weaver endorses Paiste Cymbals, Vater Sticks, DW Drums, and Remo drumheads.

Personal life
Weaver is married to his wife Penny. Weaver is a fan of Mickey Mouse, using his imagery on his clothes, drums, etc. He even named his daughter after the famous mouse.

Discography

with Petra

other projects

References

External links
Louie Weaver Drums
Viktor Band Website

1951 births
Living people
Petra (band) members
People from Nashville, Tennessee
Trevecca Nazarene University alumni
20th-century American drummers
American male drummers
20th-century American male musicians